Meshkabad-e Pain (also Romanized as Meshkābād-e Pā’īn) is a village in Larim Rural District, Gil Khuran District, Juybar County, Mazandaran Province, Iran. At the 2006 census, its population was 472, in 131 families.

References 

Populated places in Juybar County